Zeacumantus subcarinatus, common name the southern creeper, is a species of small sea snail or mud snail, a marine gastropod mollusc in the family Batillariidae.

Distribution
This species is found on the coasts of New Zealand and Australia (New South Wales).

Description
The size of an adult shell varies between 8 mm and 16 mm.

References

 Powell A. W. B., New Zealand Mollusca, William Collins Publishers Ltd, Auckland, New Zealand 1979 
 Miller M & Batt G, Reef and Beach Life of New Zealand, William Collins (New Zealand) Ltd, Auckland, New Zealand 1973
 Ozawa, T., Köhler, F., Reid, D.G. & Glaubrecht, M. (2009). Tethyan relicts on continental coastlines of the northwestern Pacific Ocean and Australasia: molecular phylogeny and fossil record of batillariid gastropods (Caenogastropoda, Cerithioidea). Zoologica Scripta, 38: 503-525
 Spencer, H.; Marshall. B. (2009). All Mollusca except Opisthobranchia. In: Gordon, D. (Ed.) (2009). New Zealand Inventory of Biodiversity. Volume One: Kingdom Animalia. 584 pp

External links
 
 Bruce A. Marshall, Molluscan and brachiopod taxa introduced by F. W. Hutton in The New Zealand journal of science; Journal of the Royal Society of New Zealand, Volume 25, Issue 4, 1995

Batillariidae
Gastropods of New Zealand
Gastropods described in 1855